Blériot may refer to:
 Louis Blériot, a French aviation pioneer
 Blériot Aéronautique, an aircraft manufacturer founded by Louis Blériot
 Blériot-Whippet, a car
 Bleriot (moonlet), a propeller moonlet in Saturn's A Ring
 11248 Blériot, an asteroid
 Louis Blériot medal given by the Fédération Aéronautique Internationale